Elanji  is a village in Ernakulam district, Indian state of Kerala.

Demographics
 census, Elanji had a population of 16,995 with 8,455 males and 8,540 females. The majority of people living in Elanji are Syro Malabar Catholic Christians.

There are three main churches and more than 13 temples in Elanji. Mudhevar temple, located at Mutholapuram is the oldest one. It  is more than 900 years old. The Chief among the churches is the St Peter's and St Paul's Syro Malabar Catholic church established in AD 1300 belonging to the Diocese of Pala. Mutholapuram church and the other one being Xavierpuram (Kooru) church. The St. Peter's and Paul's church is also a forane church.

The nearest  are Piravom, Kuravilangad, Koothattukulam, 
Peruva and Thalayolaparambu . The taluk headquarters at Muvattupuzha is  27 km away. The village lies about 42 km southeast of Kochi and there are a number of buses that ply between Pala and Ernakulam, which connects Elanji with Kochi.  Elanji is almost the mid-way point on the Vaikom–Thodupuzha bus route. Elanji lies about 32 km east of Kottayam town. There is a Panchayath bus stand in the heart of the Elanji town itself. Elanji is located in Ernakulam district and the last grama panchayth towards the eastern border (towards Kottayam side) of Ernakulam district.

The Vijnan Institute of Science and Technology (VISAT), an engineering college established in the year 2011, is 2 km away from this town. The engineering college is AICTE approved and affiliated to APJ Abdul Kalam Technological University(KTU). This college comes under the Vinjyan Charitable Trust.

Most inhabitants are engaged in agriculture, farming and trading, with the main cash crops being rubber, paddy, coconut, areca nut, ginger, turmeric, 'kacholam' and pepper.

The Malayalam poet Sister Mary Benigna was born in Elanji.The Malayalam novelist Sri Perumbadavam Sreedharan was born in Elanji. He is also known as Perumbadavam. Malayalam director Jeethu Joseph (of Drishyam fame) is also from Elanji.
There is also a famous Hindu temple in the name of Shiva; the speciality of this temple is that the main door opens to the west direction. This type of Shiva temples is rare in Kerala state. The name Elanji was believed to be derived from the word Elavanjiyoor d-e-s-am. During the passage of time desam has been dropped off and Elavanjiyoor became Elanji. Elanji is also the name of a tree with fragrant blooms commonly nfound in Elanji village area. One of the oldest and famous high schools in and around Elanji (Monippally, Neezhoor, etc.) is St. Peter's High Secondary School Elanji, which used to be known as St. Peter's High School Elanji.

References

Villages in Ernakulam district